Adrianus Cornelis "Adrie" Koster (born 18 November 1954) is a Dutch football manager who was most recently the manager of Willem II. He is a former winger and former manager of Ajax, Club Brugge and the Netherlands U21 team.

Career
He played for Roda JC (1977–79) and PSV Eindhoven (1979–83). He played his last match in the Eredivisie on 2 October 1982, replacing Jurrie Koolhof. In the following season 1983/1984 he retired from professional football as a player.

International
Koster obtained three caps (no goals) for the Netherlands national football team in 1978.

Managerial career
Three years after the end of his playing career, Koster began his managerial career. His first job was the second-tier Eerste Divisie club FC Eindhoven, where he worked as an assistant coach for a year. He then went to the Eredivisie club Willem II, where he worked alongside Piet de Visser. After the club had found itself in a relegation battle under his leadership for two seasons, Koster took over the reigns as head coach. This did not bring a change, which meant that he was dismissed after barely a year in charge, and he was again replaced by De Visser in 1991.

In 1991, Koster took over as head coach for Roda JC, where he had been active as a player. Two years later, Huub Stevens took over as head coach and Koster returned to the Eerste Divisie to coach first Helmond Sport and since TOP Oss, before moving to Excelsior in 1997. Koster had his longest employment there and in 2002, he won promotion to the Eredivisie with the club. He could, however, not avoid relegation the following season, and Koster was dismissed after six years in charge. In the following season, he led VVV-Venlo to the Eerste Divisie promotion play-offs, but did not manage to achieve promotion with the club. His next coaching job was RKC Waalwijk, where Koster was dismissed after a year due to poor results in 2006.

He became head of the youth academy of Ajax, and was appointed manager of the club's main squad on 9 October 2007, when Henk ten Cate went to Chelsea.

On 8 April 2009, Koster replaced Jacky Mathijssen as Club Brugge manager, with him signing a contract until the end of the season with an option for an extra season. On 25 February 2010, Koster's contract with Club Brugge was extended until the summer of 2011. He joined Beerschot following the 2011–12 season.

In June 2013, Koster signed a contract with Club Africain. Although the club was first in the league, Koster was sacked in January 2014.

In March 2014, Koster was named head coach of the Netherlands U21 team, after successfully managing the Netherlands U20 team in 2012.

On 25 November 2014, Koster started to work for VfB Stuttgart as field coach of Huub Stevens.

On 26 August 2015, Koster was appointed assistant national team coach of Saudi Arabia, where he came to work under the national coach, fellow Dutchman Bert van Marwijk.

On 1 July 2018, Koster was appointed head coach of Willem II for the second time in his career. He managed to qualify the team for the KNVB Cup final for the fourth time in club history, in which Ajax, however, proved too strong and won 0–4. Because they made the final, Willem II qualified for the UEFA Europa League for the first time since 2005. Willem II also avoided relegation in the Eredivisie.

References

External links
 

1954 births
Living people
Dutch footballers
Netherlands international footballers
Dutch football managers
Dutch expatriate football managers
Association football wingers
PSV Eindhoven players
Roda JC Kerkrade players
Eredivisie players
Willem II (football club) managers
Roda JC Kerkrade managers
Helmond Sport managers
TOP Oss managers
Excelsior Rotterdam managers
VVV-Venlo managers
RKC Waalwijk managers
AFC Ajax managers
Jong Ajax managers
Club Brugge KV head coaches
Eredivisie managers
AFC Ajax non-playing staff
UEFA Euro 1980 players
Footballers from Zierikzee
Club Africain football managers
Beerschot A.C. managers
Expatriate football managers in Belgium
Expatriate football managers in Saudi Arabia
Expatriate football managers in Tunisia
Expatriate football managers in Germany
Dutch expatriate sportspeople in Belgium
Dutch expatriate sportspeople in Saudi Arabia
Dutch expatriate sportspeople in Germany
Willem II (football club) non-playing staff